The Reagan–Fascell Democracy Fellowship Program is a program of the National Endowment for Democracy (NED). It is named for Ronald Reagan and the late congressman Dante Fascell. Fellows are resident for five months at the NED's International Forum for Democratic Studies. There are around 16–20 Fellows per year.

References

External links
 NED, Current & Past Fellows

National Endowment for Democracy
Reagan-Fascell Democracy Fellows